In microbiology, the minimum inhibitory concentration (MIC) is the lowest concentration of a chemical, usually a drug, which prevents visible growth of a bacterium or bacteria. MIC depends on the microorganism, the affected human being (in vivo only), and the antibiotic itself. It is often expressed in micrograms per milliliter (μg/mL) or milligrams per liter (mg/L).

The MIC is determined by preparing  of the chemical in vitro at increasing concentrations, incubating the solutions with separate batches of cultured bacteria, and measuring the results using agar dilution or broth microdilution. Results have been graded into susceptible (often called sensitive), increased exposure, or resistant to a particular antimicrobial by using a breakpoint. Breakpoints are agreed upon values, published in guidelines of a reference body, such as the U.S. Clinical and Laboratory Standards Institute (CLSI), the British Society for Antimicrobial Chemotherapy (BSAC) or the European Committee on Antimicrobial Susceptibility Testing (EUCAST). There have been major discrepancies between the breakpoints from various European countries over the years, and between those from the European Committee on Antimicrobial Susceptibility Testing (EUCAST) and the US Clinical and Laboratory Standards Institute (CLSI).

While MIC is the lowest concentration of an antibacterial agent necessary to inhibit visible growth, minimum bactericidal concentration (MBC) is the minimum concentration of an antibacterial agent that results in bacterial death. The closer the MIC is to the MBC, the more bactericidal the compound.

The first step in drug discovery is often the screening of a library drug candidate for MICs against bacteria of interest. As such, MICs are usually the starting point for larger pre-clinical evaluations of novel antimicrobial agents. The purpose of measuring the minimum inhibitory concentration is to ensure that antibiotics are chosen efficiently to increase the success of treatment.

Background

History 
After the discovery and commercialization of antibiotics, microbiologist, pharmacologist, and physician Alexander Fleming developed the broth dilution technique using the turbidity of the broth for assessment. This is commonly believed to be the conception point of minimum inhibitory concentrations. Later in the 1980s, Clinical and Laboratory Standards Institute has consolidated the methods and standards for MIC determination and clinical usage. Following the discovery of new antibacterials, pathogens and their evolution, the protocols by CLSI are also continually updated to reflect that change. The protocols and parameters set by CLSI are considered to be the "gold standard" in the United States and are used by regulatory authorities, such as the FDA, to make evaluations.

Clinical usage 
Nowadays, the MIC is used in antimicrobial susceptibility testing. The MIC is reported by providing the susceptibility interpretation next to each antibiotic. The different susceptibility interpretations are: S (Sensitive), I (Intermediate), and R (Resistant). These interpretations were created and implemented by the Clinical and Laboratory Standards Institute (CLSI). In clinics, more often than not, exact pathogens cannot be easily determined by symptoms of the patient. Then, even if the pathogen is determined, different serotypes of pathogens, such as Staphylococcus aureus, have varying levels of resistance to antimicrobials. As such, it is difficult to prescribe correct antimicrobials. The MIC is determined in such cases by growing the pathogen isolate from the patient on plate or broth, which is later used in the assay. Thus, knowledge of the MIC will provide a physician valuable information for making a prescription. Accurate and precise usage of antimicrobials is also important in the context of multidrug-resistant bacteria. Microbes such as bacteria have been gaining resistance to antimicrobials they were previously susceptible to.  Usage of incompatible levels of antimicrobials provides the selective pressure that has driven the direction and evolution of resistance of bacterial pathogens. This has been seen at sub-MIC levels of antibiotics. As such, it is increasingly important to determine the MIC in order to make the best choice in prescribing antimicrobials.

MIC is used clinically over MBC because MIC is more easily determined. Minimum bactericidal concentration (MBC), which is the minimum antibacterial concentration resulting in microbial death, is defined by the inability to re-culture bacteria.  In addition, drug effectiveness is generally similar when taken at both MIC and MBC concentrations because the host immune system can expel the pathogen when bacterial proliferation is at a standstill. When the MBC is much higher than the MIC, drug toxicity makes taking the MBC of the drug detrimental to patient. Antimicrobial toxicity can come in many forms, such as immune hypersensitivity and off-target toxicity.

Methods

Broth dilution assay 
There are three main reagents necessary to run this assay: the media, an antimicrobial agent, and the microbe being tested. The most commonly used media is cation-adjusted Mueller Hinton Broth, due to its ability to support the growth of most pathogens and its lack of inhibitors towards common antibiotics. Depending on the pathogen and antibiotics being tested, the media can be changed and/or adjusted. The antimicrobial concentration is adjusted into the correct concentration by mixing stock antimicrobial with media. The adjusted antimicrobial is serially diluted into multiple tubes (or wells) to obtain a gradient. The dilution rate can be adjusted depending on the breakpoint and the practitioner's needs. The microbe, or the inoculating agent, must come from the same colony-forming unit, and must be at the correct concentration. This may be adjusted by incubation time and dilution. For verification, the positive control is plated in a hundred fold dilution to count colony forming units. The microbes inoculate the tubes (or plate) and are incubated for 16–20 hours. The MIC is generally determined by turbidity.

Etest 

Etests can also be used as an alternative method to determine minimal inhibitory concentration values of a wide range of antimicrobial agents against different organism groups which has been widely used in microbiology laboratories around the world. Manufactured by bioMérieux, Etests are a ready-to-use, non-porous plastic reagent strip with a predefined gradient of antibiotic, covering a continuous concentration range.

See also 
Kirby–Bauer test
Arthur Thomas Palin, pioneer in drinking water chlorination treatment and testing

References 

Microbiology terms